Callulops humicola is a species of frog in the family Microhylidae.
It is endemic to Papua New Guinea.
Its natural habitats are subtropical or tropical moist montane forests and heavily degraded former forest.
It is threatened by habitat loss.

References

Callulops
Amphibians of Papua New Guinea
Taxonomy articles created by Polbot
Amphibians described in 1972